Produlești is a commune in Dâmbovița County, Muntenia, Romania with a population of 3,516 people. It is composed of three villages: Broșteni, Costeștii din Deal and Produlești.

References

Communes in Dâmbovița County
Localities in Muntenia